Conus vappereaui is a species of sea snail, a marine gastropod mollusk in the family Conidae, the cone snails, cone shells or cones.

These snails are predatory and venomous. They are capable of "stinging" humans.

Description
The size of the shell varies between 40 mm and 60 mm.

Distribution
This marine species occurs in the Pacific Ocean off Tahiti and Tuamotu.

References

 Monteiro A. (2009) A new subspecies of Conus moluccensis Küster, 1838 (Mollusca: Gastropoda) from Tahiti. Visaya 2(5): 88-90.
Conus (Gastropoda, Conidae) from offshore French Polynesia: Description of dredging from TARASOC expedition, with new records and new species. Xenophora Taxonomy 5: 26-49

External links
 
 To World Register of Marine Species
 

vappereaui
Gastropods described in 2009